The 2021 European 10,000m Cup took place on 5 June 2021 in Birmingham. The races should have taken place on Parliament Hill Athletics Track in London, Great Britain. in conjunction with the Night of the 10,000m PBs in London for the third successive edition but this event was cancelled in January 2021 due to concerns that the Parliament Hill was not yet a coronavirus-secure facility. The event was postponed and moved to the University of Birmingham Athletics Track and combined the British Athletics 10,000m Championships which also served as the qualifying event for the 2020 Summer Olympic Games.

Medallists

Race results

Men's

Women's

* Athletes who competed in the British Athletics 10,000m Championships but were not entered for the European Cup. The results of these athletes were not counted towards the final team score.

References

External links
 Official website
 Individual results at EAA website
 Men's A race results
 Men's B race results
 Women's A race results
 Women's B race results
 Team standings
 Results at Power of 10
 Results 

European Cup 10,000m
European Cup 10,000m
International sports competitions in Birmingham, West Midlands
Athletics in the United Kingdom
European 10,000m Cup
European 10,000m Cup
European 10,000m Cup